The Bulgarian–Serbian wars of 917–924 were a series of conflicts fought between the Bulgarian Empire and the Principality of Serbia as a part of the greater Byzantine–Bulgarian war of 913–927. After the Byzantine army was annihilated by the Bulgarians in the battle of Achelous, the Byzantine diplomacy incited the Principality of Serbia to attack Bulgaria from the west. The Bulgarians dealt with that threat and replaced the Serbian prince with a protégé of their own. In the following years the two empires competed for control over Serbia. In 924 the Serbs rose again, ambushed and defeated a small Bulgarian army. That turn of events provoked a major retaliatory campaign that ended with the annexation of Serbia in the end of the same year.

Prelude 
Soon after Simeon I (r. 893–927) ascended to the throne, he successfully defended Bulgaria's commercial interests, acquired territory between the Black Sea and the Strandzha mountains, and imposed an annual tribute on the Byzantine Empire as a result of the Byzantine–Bulgarian war of 894–896. The outcome of the war confirmed the Bulgarian domination on the Balkans but also exposed the country's vulnerability to foreign intervention under the influence of the Byzantine diplomacy. As soon as the peace with Byzantium had been signed, Simeon I sought to secure the Bulgarian positions in the western Balkans. After the death of prince Mutimir (r. 850–891), several members of the ruling dynasty fought for the throne of the Principality of Serbia. In 892 Petar Gojniković established himself as a prince. In 897 Simeon I agreed to recognize Petar and put him under his protection, resulting in a twenty-year period of peace and stability to the west. However, Petar was not content with his subordinate position and sought ways to achieve independence.

After almost two decades of peace between Bulgaria and the Byzantine Empire, the Byzantine emperor Alexander (r. 912–913) provoked a conflict with Bulgaria in 913. Simeon I, who was seeking pretext to confront the Byzantines to claim an imperial title for himself, took the opportunity to wage war. Unlike his predecessors, Simeon I's ultimate ambition was to assume the throne of Constantinople as a Roman emperor, creating a joint Bulgarian–Roman state. Later that year he forced the Byzantines to recognize him as Emperor of the Bulgarians (in Bulgarian, Tsar) and to betroth his daughter to the under-age emperor Constantine VII, which would have paved his way to become father-in-law and guardian of the emperor. However, after a coup d'état in February 914 the new Byzantine government under Constantine VII's mother Zoe Karbonopsina revoked the concessions and the hostilities continued. On 20 August 917 the Byzantines suffered a devastating defeat at the hands of the Bulgarian army in the Battle of Achelous which de facto brought the Balkans under Bulgarian control. Weeks later, another Byzantine host was heavily defeated in the battle of Katasyrtai just outside Constantinople in night combat.

Wars 

Shortly before the Battle of Achelous the Byzantines had tried to create a wide anti-Bulgarian coalition. As part of their efforts the strategos of Dyrrachium Leo Rhabdouchos was instructed to negotiate with the Serbian prince Petar Gojniković, who was a Bulgarian vassal. Petar Gojniković responded positively but the Bulgarian court in Preslav was warned about the negotiations by prince Michael of Zahumlje, a loyal ally of Bulgaria, and Simeon I was able to prevent an immediate Serb attack.

Following the victories in 917, the way to Constantinople lay open, but Simeon I decided to deal with prince Petar Gojniković before advancing further against the Byzantines. An army was dispatched under the command of Theodore Sigritsa and Marmais. The two persuaded Petar Gojniković to meet them, seized him and sent him to Preslav, where he died in prison. The Bulgarians replaced Petar with Pavle Branović, a grandson of prince Mutimir, who had long lived in Preslav. Thus, Serbia was turned into a puppet state until 921.

In an attempt to bring Serbia under their control, in 920 the Byzantines sent Zaharija Pribislavljević, another of Mutimir's grandsons, to challenge the rule of Pavle. Zaharija was either captured by the Bulgarians en route or by Pavle, who had him duly delivered to Simeon I. In either way, Zaharija ended up in Preslav. Despite the setback, the Byzantines persisted and eventually bribed Pavle to switch sides after lashing much gold on him. In response, in 921 Simeon I sent a Bulgarian army headed by Zaharija. The Bulgarian intervention was successful, Pavle was easily deposed and once again a Bulgarian candidate was placed on the Serbian throne.

The Bulgarian control did not last long, because Zaharija was raised in Constantinople where he was heavily influenced by the Byzantines. Soon Zaharija openly declared his loyalty to the Byzantine Empire and commenced hostilities against Bulgaria. In 923 or in 924 Simeon I sent a small army led by Thedore Sigritsa and Marmais but they were ambushed and killed. Zaharija sent their heads and armour to Constantinople. This action provoked a major retaliatory campaign in 924. A large Bulgarian force was dispatched, accompanied by a new candidate, Časlav, who was born in Preslav to a Bulgarian mother. The Bulgarians ravaged the countryside and forced Zaharija to flee to the Kingdom of Croatia.

This time, however, the Bulgarians had decided to change the approach towards the Serbs. They summoned all Serbian župans to pay homage to Časlav, had them arrested and taken to Preslav. Serbia was annexed as a Bulgarian province, expanding the country's border to Croatia, which at the time had reached its apogee and proved to be a dangerous neighbour. The annexation was a necessary move since the Serbs had proved to be unreliable allies and Simeon I had grown wary of the inevitable pattern of war, bribery and defection. According to Constantine VII's book De Administrando Imperio Simeon I resettled the whole population to the interior of Bulgaria and those who avoided captivity fled to Croatia, leaving the country deserted.

Aftermath 

The Bulgarian advance in the Western Balkans were checked by the Croats who defeated a Bulgarian army in 926. Similarly to the case of Serbia, Croatia was invaded in the context of the Byzantine–Bulgarian conflict, because king Tomislav (r. 910–928) was a Byzantine ally and harboured enemies of Bulgaria. After the death of Simeon I on 27 May 927 his son and successor Peter I (r. 927–969) concluded a favourable peace treaty with the Byzantines, securing recognition of the Imperial title of the Bulgarian rulers, an independent Bulgarian Patriarchate and an annual tribute.

Despite this diplomatic success and the end of the 14-year-long conflict, the beginning of Peter I's reign was plagued by internal instability. The young monarch faced two consecutive revolts by his brothers Ivan and Michael. The Serbian prince Časlav took advantage Peter I's internal problems. In 928 or 931 he managed to escape from Preslav and to assert Serbia's independence from Bulgaria under Byzantine overlordship. With Byzantine financial and diplomatic support he managed to repopulate and reorganize the country.

See also

Footnotes

Notes

Citations

Sources 
Primary sources
 

Secondary sources

 
 
 
 
 
 
 
 
 
 
 
 
 

10th century in Bulgaria
10th century in Serbia
Wars involving the First Bulgarian Empire
Wars involving medieval Serbian states
910s conflicts
920s conflicts
Byzantine–Bulgarian Wars
Bulgarian–Serbian Wars
Principality of Serbia (early medieval)